Rick Newsom (March 19, 1950 – August 16, 1988), was a NASCAR Winston Cup driver from Fort Mill, South Carolina.

Newsom competed in 82 Winston Cup races from 1972 to 1986.

He was killed in a private plane crash on August 16, 1988.

Motorsports career results

NASCAR
(key) (Bold – Pole position awarded by qualifying time. Italics – Pole position earned by points standings or practice time. * – Most laps led.)

Winston Cup Series

Daytona 500

References

1950 births
1988 deaths
NASCAR drivers
Victims of aviation accidents or incidents in the United States
People from Fort Mill, South Carolina
Racing drivers from South Carolina